Psyllaephagus is a genus of chalcid wasps. It was named and circumscribed by William Harris Ashmead in 1900. , Psyllaephagus contains approximately 245 species.

References

Encyrtinae
Hymenoptera genera